Malhar Pandya is an Indian actor.

Early life
He was born 9 November to a Gujarati family in Ahmedabad, Gujarat. He won the title of Mr. Gujarat by winning a body-building competition.

Career 
He acted in Hindi television shows, Ramayan (2012) and Hamari Saas Leela (2011). He also acted in Life OK’s mythological drama, Devon Ke Dev...Mahadev (2011–2014).

In 2015, Malhar appeared in two Gujarati films,  Romance Complicated directed by Dhwani Gautam and Premji Rise of A Warrior.
In 2016, he appeared in Balaji Telefilms fiction show Kasam Tere Pyaar Ki on Colors TV as Pavan Malhotra, the main male antagonist. Later, in the same year he appeared in Balaji Telefilms weekend horror/ thriller show Kavach... Kaali Shaktiyon Se on Colors TV as a psychiatrist (for few episodes) and Balaji Telefilms weekend fantasy show Naagin 2 on Colors TV as well, as an 'ichchhadhaari naag' (cameo in premiere episode).

Personal life 
Pandya’s father Laxmikant Pandya is a director, writer, actor and lyricist of television industry. His mother Bharti Pandya is also a Gujarati theatre actress. In 2014, he married Priya Patidar, a Bollywood singer.

Films

Television shows

References

External links 
 
 
 
 

Indian male film actors
1982 births
Living people
Indian male television actors
Male actors in Gujarati-language films
Gujarati theatre
Gujarati people
Male actors from Ahmedabad